Tinix (Try It as miNIX-like operating system), is a tutorial operating system (OS) written by Yu Yuan. It is used to teach fundamentals rather than to do work. In his book "Writing OS DIY", Yu provides all source code for Tinix. 
Tinix borrows many concepts and methods from Minix. The book compensates for practical computer programming skills, especially in x86 assembly language, lacking in Andrew S. Tanenbaum's book "Operating Systems: Design and Implementation", 1987, 1997, 2006.

References

Unix variants
Free software operating systems
Microkernels
Microkernel-based operating systems
Educational operating systems